The British Philosophical Association (BPA) is a British organisation set up in October 2002 to promote the study of philosophy.

Early history
During the early 1980s the merging of educational establishments and financial cut-backs meant that some philosophy departments had closed and more were under threat. The National Committee for Philosophy (NCP) was formed to try and address this. The committee was successful and, following on from their success sought to secure the future of the subject of philosophy in education. 

The NCP evolved – after three years of discussion and planning – into the British Philosophical Association (BPA) and agreed its constitution, "to promote and foster the teaching and study of, and research in Philosophy in the United Kingdom, within higher education and also within the wider community", at a meeting in Liverpool 30 October 2002. The first annual meeting was held on 24 October 2003 at Westminster, in the House of Commons.

Executive committee members

Previous 
 President 2003–2004 Roger Trigg 
 Secretary 2003–2007 Jonathan Wolff 
 Treasurer 2008–2016 Mark Addis

Current 
Current members are: 
 President Fiona Macpherson
 Director Joe Morrison
 Executive Secretary Marthe Kerkwijk
 Treasurer Stella Sandford

Presidents
 2003–2004: Roger Trigg
 2004–2006: The Baroness O'Neill of Bengarve
 2006–2009: Brad Hooker
 2009–2012: M. M. McCabe
 2012–2019: Robert Stern
 2019–present: Fiona Macpherson

Publications

References

External links
 British Philosophical Association

Educational organisations based in the United Kingdom
Organizations established in 2002
Philosophical societies in the United Kingdom
2002 establishments in the United Kingdom